Midorikawa is a Japanese surname. Notable people with the name include:

Hikaru Midorikawa (born 1968), Japanese voice actor
Yōichi Midorikawa (1915–2001), Japanese photographer
Yuki Midorikawa (born 1976), Japanese manga artist

Fictional
Hana Midorikawa, secretary of the Underground Student Council from the manga/anime series Prison School.
Nao Midorikawa, civilian identity of Cure March from the anime series Smile Pretty Cure!

See also
Midorikawa Station, Railway station on the Misumi Line, operated by Kyushu Railway Company in Uto, Kumamoto, Japan

Japanese-language surnames